Peter Adolf Thiessen (6 April 1899 – 5 March 1990) was a German physical chemist. He voluntarily went to the Soviet Union at the close of World War II, and he received high Soviet decorations and the Stalin Prize for contributions to the Soviet program of nuclear weapons.

Education
Thiessen was born in Schweidnitz (modern Świdnica, Poland).

From 1919 to 1923, he attended Breslau University, Albert Ludwigs University of Freiburg, University of Greifswald, and University of Göttingen. He received his doctorate in 1923 under Richard Adolf Zsigmondy at Göttingen.

Career

Early years

In 1923, Thiessen was a supernumerary assistant at the University of Göttingen and from 1924 to 1930 was a regular teaching assistant. He joined the Nationalsozialistische Deutsche Arbeiterpartei (Nazi Party) in 1925. He became a Privatdozent at Göttingen in 1926. In 1930, he became head of the department of inorganic chemistry there, and in 1932 he also became an untenured extraordinarius professor.

In 1933, Thiessen became a department head at the Kaiser-Wilhelm Institut für physikalische Chemie und Elektrochemie (KWIPC) of the Kaiser-Wilhelm Gesellschaft (KWG). For a short time in 1935, he became an ordinarius professor of chemistry at the University of Münster. Later, that year and until 1945, he became an ordinarius professor at the Humboldt University of Berlin and director of the KWIPC in Berlin-Dahlem. As director of the KWIPC, he transformed it into a model National Socialist organization.

Thiessen was the main advisor and confidant to Rudolf Mentzel, who was head of the chemistry and organic materials section of the Reichsforschungsrat (RFR, Reich Research Council). Thiessen, as director of the KWIPC, had a flat on Faradayweg in Dahlem that the former director Fritz Haber used for business purposes; Thiessen shared this flat with Mentzel.

In the Soviet Union

Before the end of World War II, Thiessen had Communist contacts. He, Manfred von Ardenne, director of his private laboratory Forschungslaboratoriums für Elektronenphysik,  Gustav Hertz, Nobel Laureate and director of the second research laboratory at Siemens, and Max Volmer, ordinarius professor and director of the Physical Chemistry Institute at the Berlin Technische Hochschule, had made a pact. The pact was a pledge that whoever first made contact with the Soviets would speak for the rest. The objectives of their pact were threefold: (1) prevent plunder of their institutes, (2) continue their work with minimal interruption, and (3) protect themselves from prosecution for any political acts of the past. On 27 April 1945, Thiessen arrived at von Ardenne’s institute in an armored vehicle with a major of the Soviet Army, who was also a leading Soviet chemist.  All four were taken to the Soviet Union. Von Ardenne was made head of Institute A, in Sinop, a suburb of Sukhumi. Hertz was made head of Institute G, in Agudseri (Agudzery), about 10 km southeast of Sukhumi and a suburb of Gul’rips (Gulrip’shi). Volmer went to the Nauchno-Issledovatel’skij Institut-9 (NII-9, Scientific Research Institute No. 9), in Moscow; he was given a design bureau to work on the production of heavy water.  In Institute A, Thiessen became leader for developing techniques for manufacturing porous barriers for isotope separation.

In 1949, six German scientists, including Hertz, Thiessen, and Barwich, were called in for consultation at Sverdlovsk-44, which was responsible for uranium enrichment. The plant, which was smaller than the American Oak Ridge gaseous diffusion plant, was getting only a little over half of the expected 90% or higher enrichment.

Awards for uranium enrichment technologies were made in 1951 after testing of a bomb with uranium; the first test was with plutonium. Thiessen received a Stalin Prize, first class.

He is credited with founding the field of tribochemistry.

Return to Germany

Thiessen returned to the Deutsche Demokratische Republik (DDR, German Democratic Republic) in the mid-1950s as a Fellow of the Academy of Sciences and from 1956 was director of the Institute of Physical Chemistry in East Berlin. From 1957 to 1965, he was also chairman of the Forschungsrat der DDR (Research Council of the German Democratic Republic).

He died in Berlin in 1990.

Books
Peter Adolf Thiessen and Helmut Sandig Planung der Forschung (Dietz, 1961)
Peter Adolf Thiessen Erfahrungen, Erkenntnisse, Folgerungen (Akademie-Verlag, 1979)
Peter Adolf Thiessen Forschung und Praxis formen die neue Technik (Urania-Verl., 1961)
Peter Adolf Thiessen Vorträge zum Festkolloquium anlässlich des 65. Geburtstages von P. A. Thiessen  (Akademie-Verl., 1966)
Peter Adolf Thiessen, Klaus Meyer, and Gerhard Heinicke Grundlagen der Tribochemie (Akademi-Verlar, 1967)

Articles
Peter Adolf Thiessen Die physikalische Chemie im nationalsozialistischen Staat, Der Deutscher Chemiker. Mitteilungen aus Stand / Beruf und Wissenschaft (Supplement to Angewandte Chemie. Zeitschrift des Vereins Deutsche Chemiker, No.19.) Volume 2, No. 5, May 9, 1936. Reprinted in English in Hentschel, Klaus (editor) and Ann M. Hentschel (editorial assistant and translator) Physics and National Socialism: An Anthology of Primary Sources (Birkhäuser, 1996) 134-137 as Document 48. Thiessen: Physical Chemistry in the National Socialist State [May 9, 1936].

Notes

References
Albrecht, Ulrich, Andreas Heinemann-Grüder, and Arend Wellmann Die Spezialisten: Deutsche Naturwissenschaftler und Techniker in der Sowjetunion nach 1945 (Dietz, 1992, 2001) 
Barwich, Heinz and Elfi Barwich Das rote Atom (Fischer-TB.-Vlg., 1984)
Beneke, Klaus Die Kolloidwissenschaftler Peter Adolf Thiessen, Gerhart Jander, Robert Havemann, Hans Witzmann und ihre Zeit (Knof, 2000)
Heinemann-Grüder, Andreas Die sowjetische Atombombe (Westfaelisches Dampfboot, 1992)
Heinemann-Grüder, Andreas Keinerlei Untergang: German Armaments Engineers during the Second World War and in the Service of the Victorious Powers in Monika Renneberg and Mark Walker (editors) Science, Technology and National Socialism 30-50 (Cambridge, 2002 paperback edition) 
 Hentschel, Klaus (editor) and Ann M. Hentschel (editorial assistant and translator) Physics and National Socialism: An Anthology of Primary Sources (Birkhäuser, 1996) 
Klaus Hentschel The Mental Aftermath: The Mentality of German Physicists 1945 – 1949 (Oxford, 2007) 
Holloway, David Stalin and the Bomb: The Soviet Union and Atomic Energy 1939–1956 (Yale, 1994) 
Kruglov, Arkadii The History of the Soviet Atomic Industry (Taylor and Francis, 2002)
Naimark, Norman M. The Russians in Germany: A History of the Soviet Zone of Occupation, 1945-1949 (Hardcover - Aug 11, 1995) Belknap
Oleynikov, Pavel V. German Scientists in the Soviet Atomic Project, The Nonproliferation Review Volume 7, Number 2, 1 – 30  (2000). The author has been a group leader at the Institute of Technical Physics of the Russian Federal Nuclear Center in Snezhinsk (Chelyabinsk-70).

External links
Fritz Haber Institute - MPG

1899 births
1990 deaths
German physical chemists
20th-century German chemists
People from Świdnica
People from the Province of Silesia
University of Breslau alumni
University of Freiburg alumni
University of Greifswald alumni
University of Göttingen alumni
Academic staff of the University of Göttingen
Academic staff of the University of Münster
Academic staff of the Humboldt University of Berlin
Foreign Members of the USSR Academy of Sciences
East German scientists
Members of the German Academy of Sciences at Berlin
Max Planck Institute directors
Tribologists